Erik van der Luijt (born 22 August 1970 in The Hague) is a Dutch jazz pianist and keyboard player, arranger and composer.

History
Erik van der Luijt started playing the piano at the age of four. He studied jazz piano with Rob van Kreeveld and Rob van Bavel at the Royal Conservatory of The Hague, where he participated in master classes with Michel Petrucciani and Barry Harris.

His concert performances have taken him to Sweden, France, Belgium, Indonesia, Germany and the United Kingdom. The album The Sweetest Sounds - Ilse Huizinga Sings the Songs of Richard Rodgers (2001), to which he made a major contribution as an arranger, producer and pianist, resulted in his wife Ilse Huizinga's first nomination for Holland's top music award, The Edison Award.

In August 2004 he was a finalist at the Deloitte Jazz Award 2004 at the Bimhuis cultural centre in Amsterdam. In the same year he conducted a series of masterclasses in Indonesia, at the invitation of the Conservatory of Rotterdam.

In 2004 he also released the privately produced and critically acclaimed album Express Yourself, consisting exclusively of his own compositions and on which he is accompanied by Branko Teuwen on double bass and Victor de Boo on drums. Van der Luijt quotes the fact that two members of the trio had recently married and all three had recently become a father as the drive behind the album. An increased sense of responsibility made them search more than ever for a distinctive style in order to draw more attention to themselves. Three days before the original recording date he decided that recording standards was not the best way to do this and began writing his own compositions. The album Express Yourself was hailed as "a masterpiece" in the press and compared to landmark albums by Tommy Flanagan and Bill Evans.

Involvement for Hurricane Katrina Victims
In September 2005 Erik van der Luijt and his trio played at a charity concert at the Concertgebouw to raise funds for New Orleans after the city was hit by Hurricane Katrina. Dutch Jazz for New Orleans also featured performances by Greetje Kauffeld, the Dutch Swing College band, Hans Dulfer, Laura Fygi, Trijntje Oosterhuis, Ramses Shaffy and Louis van Dijk.

Style
Critics have praised Erik van der Luijt's talent for melody and the classical influences on his work. His style is likened with the subtle cohesion of legendary Bill Evans with his trio of the late 1950s, also in its fresh chord voicings and harmonic phrasing. Others have called him "the Dutch Oscar Peterson".

Van Der Luijt reflects a bit of a Keith Jarrett influence, particularly when he reaches for some wide gospel chord voicings. Essentially, however, he's his own man, with a muscular, surging swing and a powerful left hand. Van Der Luijt doesn't quite sound like anyone else out there, which is certainly an asset. He's also an engaging, witty composer. - Allaboutjazz.com

Collaborations with other artists
Erik has contributed as a pianist, arranger and producer to six albums by his wife, the jazz singer Ilse Huizinga. He regularly accompanies and supports singers from various musical disciplines such as Rita Reys, Madeline Bell, Joke Bruijs, Joke de Kruijf, Pia Beck, Denise Jannah, Greetje Kauffeld, Heddy Lester, Gerrie van der Klei, Marjol Flore and Edwin Rutten. As a pianist, arranger and producer Erik has contributed to numerous projects, including the Metropole Orchestra, the Jazz Orchestra of the Royal Concertgebouw Orchestra, Ferdinand Povel, Piet Noordijk, Ruud Jacobs, Frits Landesbergen, Bernard Berkhout's Swingmates, the Royal Military Band, the Dutch Swing College Band, musical and cabaret productions and CDs by leading Dutch jazz musicians.

Discography
 Keytown Swings - Volume 3 (NVGCD 01091, 1991)
 Good Enough To Keep, Bernard Berkhout's New Thundering Swingmates (Polygram / Jazz Behind The Dikes, 1996)
 Out of a Dream, Ilse Huizinga (Own production, 1997)
 Voices Within, Ilse Huizinga (Own production, 1999)
 Erik van der Luijt - En Blanc Et Noir 2, Erik van der Luijt (Challenge / Daybreak, 1999)
 The Sweetest Sounds - Ilse Huizinga Sings the Songs of Richard Rodgers, Ilse Huizinga, (Challenge / Daybreak, 2001)
 Erik van der Luijt - En Blanc Et Noir 7, Erik van der Luijt (Challenge / Daybreak, 2002)
 Rainshine, Onno Voorhoeve (Own production, 2003)
 Easy to Idolize, Ilse Huizinga (Challenge / Daybreak, 2003)
 Express Yourself, Erik van der Luijt (Own production, 2004)
 Beyond Broadway, Ilse Huizinga (Maxanter Records, 2005)
 The Intimate Sessions - Volume 1, Ilse Huizinga, (Own production, 2006)

Samples
  Ilse & Ellen from the 2005 album Express Yourself

External links
 Official Web Site of Ilse Huizinga

1970 births
Bandleaders
Dutch jazz composers
Dutch jazz pianists
Living people
Musicians from The Hague
Royal Conservatory of The Hague alumni
Smooth jazz pianists
21st-century pianists